Kravica Waterfall ( or  /  or ) is a large tufa cascade on the Trebižat River, in the karstic heartland of Herzegovina in Bosnia and Herzegovina. Kravica is a popular swimming and picnic area and, during the summer, it is frequently visited by tourists.

The Kravica Falls area also has a little cafe, a rope swing, a picnic area, and a place to camp. The best time of year for visiting is during the springtime when the fall is at its fullest and the arid landscape turns a bright green. During the high season, various restaurants in the vicinity of the waterfalls mostly offer grilled dishes and fish specialties. Near the Kravica Falls is also a small grotto with stalactites made of calcium carbonate, an old mill and a sailing ship. The owner of the waterfall was a famous municipal councilor, landowner, benefactor and philanthropist from Ljubuški, Zaim-beg Selimić.

Gallery

See also

 Koćuša

References

External links

 Official website
5 Must-see Waterfalls in Bosnia.

Landforms of the Federation of Bosnia and Herzegovina
Waterfalls of Bosnia and Herzegovina
Tourism in Bosnia and Herzegovina
Tourist attractions in Bosnia and Herzegovina
Protected areas of Bosnia and Herzegovina
WKravica
Ljubuški